Michal Šmarda (born 6 July 1975) is a Czech politician. He has served as the leader of the Czech Social Democratic Party (ČSSD) since December 2021 and its vice-chairman from 2019 to 2021. Šmarda has served as the Mayor of Nové Město na Moravě since 2010.

References

1975 births
Living people
People from Nové Město na Moravě
Leaders of the Czech Social Democratic Party
Czech Social Democratic Party mayors